Noel Anthony Wilson (born 24 December 1979) is a former Indian professional footballer who played as a midfielder for FC Kochin, Churchill Brothers, Mohun Bagan, Mohamedan Sporting and Mumbai FC, in the I-League. He has represented the India national team on numerous occasions and also is a former graduate of Tata Football Academy. 

Wilson is currently the head coach of Jamshedpur FC B and also the Assistant Coach of the Jamshedpur FC senior team.

Wilson represented India B in the Bristol Freedom Cup in 1998. He made four appearances for India in 2001, competing in Millennium Soccer Super Cup matches against Iceland and Uruguay B, and in qualification games for the 2002 FIFA World Cup against Iceland and the United Arab Emirates.

Wilson completed his AFC C License in August 2014. He is a coach at Roots Football Academy, and has been involved in coaching with the Real Madrid Foundation in India.

Club career

Tata Football Academy 
Wilson began attending the Tata Football Academy in 1996, graduating in 1998 as part of the third batch of cadets alongside Mahesh Gawli and Deepak Kumar Mondal.

International career 
Wilson represented the Blue Tigers in the late 1990s and early 2000s. His debut came in the AFC Qualifying tournament in Bangalore in the year 1998. The qualifiers also consisted of Pakistan, Kyrgyzstan, Sri Lanka, and Bhutan. Upon qualifying and reaching the final round which was held in Thailand, India had to fend off strong teams like Qatar, Thailand, Kuwait & Uzbekistan. Wilson was a regular starter in this tournament.

Wilson then went onto representing the senior team in the 50yrs Independence Cup held in Sri Lanka in 1999. India played against Sri Lanka, Maldives, Malaysia. India had then played Sri Lanka in the final of the tournament. Wilson then played the SAFF Games held in Nepal in 1999.

After playing the Pre Olympics between Thailand in 2000, Wilson was a part of the team that played the Millennium Cup in Kochi in 2000. It involved teams such as Uruguay, Iceland and Indonesia.

He also played the World Cup Qualifiers held in Bangalore in 2001 vs UAE, Yemen, and Brunei, playing both the home and away legs.

Managerial career 
After retiring from football, Wilson started to work as a mentor and youth coach at SUFC in March 2013.

Currently he is a regular at Roots Football Academy in Bangalore.

After successfully completing AFC C licence and AFC B licenses he is now an AFC A licence holder which only a handful of Indian coaches possess. Wilson was recently appointed as the head coach of South United FC, he took over from the Spanish coach Miquel Llado Plana. His first managerial victory came against Fateh Hyderabad AFC when his side beat the later 1-0. This was also SUFC's first victory in 2018-19 I-League 2nd Division.

Wilson was appointed as Jamshedpur FC B Head Coach in January 2020. The team participated in the I-League 2nd Division and were on a good trajectory before the COVID-19 Pandemic stopped all football activities. Later in the year, Wilson was added to the senior team Technical Staff of Jamshedpur FC as Assistant Coach to Owen Coyle. Wilson also led the Jamshedpur FC B team in the 2021 Durand Cup in September 2021.

Honours

India
 South Asian Games Bronze medal: 1999

Notes

References

1979 births
Living people
Footballers from Bangalore
Anglo-Indian people
Indian footballers
India international footballers
FC Kochin players
Churchill Brothers FC Goa players
Mohun Bagan AC players
Mohammedan SC (Kolkata) players
Mumbai FC players
I-League players
Association football midfielders
South Asian Games medalists in football
South Asian Games bronze medalists for India